Nikolsk is a town and the administrative center of Nikolsky District in Vologda Oblast, Russia, located on the right bank of the Yug River. Population:

History
The area was populated by Finnic peoples. In the 14th-15th centuries, during the colonization, it was a disputed territory between the Grand Duchy of Moscow and the Novgorod Republic. Novgorod controlled a major part of the Russian North, and, in particular, all areas along the Sukhona River northeast of what is now Nikolsky District. Moscow controlled Veliky Ustyug, which it inherited from the Vladimir–Suzdal Principality, while the Yug River was the waterway it used to get to Veliky Ustyug. It is known that in 1425 Nikolsk and surrounding territories paid tribute to Novgorod. In the end of the 15th century, the Grand Duchy of Moscow took over the Novgorod's territories and Nikolsk became one of the key points on the way from Moscow to the White Sea, which until 1703 was the main route for the foreign trade in Russia. The harbor of Nikolsk in particular was used to transport cargo.

In the course of the administrative reform carried out in 1708 by Peter the Great, the territory was included into Archangelgorod Governorate. In 1780, the governorate was abolished and transformed into Vologda Viceroyalty. At the same time, Nikolsk became the seat of an uyezd and was granted town rights. The viceroyalty was abolished in 1796 and Nikolsky Uyezd was transferred to Vologda Governorate. On July 24, 1918, the territory was transferred to the newly established Northern Dvina Governorate with the administrative center located in Veliky Ustyug. On April 18, 1924, the uyezds were abolished in favor of the new divisions, the districts, at which time Nikolsky District was established.

Geography

Climate

Administrative and municipal status
Within the framework of administrative divisions, Nikolsk serves as the administrative center of Nikolsky District. As an administrative division, it is incorporated within Nikolsky District as the town of district significance of Nikolsk. As a municipal division, the town of district significance of Nikolsk is incorporated within Nikolsky Municipal District as Nikolsk Urban Settlement.

Economy

Industry
In Nikolsk, timber industry and food industry, including meat, milk, and bread production, are present. There is also linum textile production.

Transportation
The town used to be served by the Nikolsk Airport, which is currently closed.

Paved roads connect Nikolsk with Pyshchug and Manturovo in the south, crossing the border with Kostroma Oblast, with Totma in the west, and with Veliky Ustyug via Kichmengsky Gorodok in the north. There is regular bus service on these roads as well as local bus traffic.

The Yug River is navigable downstream from Nikolsk; however, there is no passenger navigation.

There are no railroads around Nikolsk and the closest railway stations with regular passenger service are Kotlas in Arkhangelsk Oblast and Sharya in Kostroma Oblast. There were plans to extend the Monza Railroad, a railway built for timber transport, which runs along the border of Vologda and Kostroma Oblasts, to Nikolsk; however, these plans never came to fruition.

Culture and recreation

Nikolsk hosts sixty objects designated as cultural and historical heritage of local importance. These are the remains of the pre-1917 Nikolsk.

Author Alexander Yashin, associated with the Village Prose movement in Russian literature, was born in 1913 in what is now Nikolsky District, got his education in Nikolsk, and lived in the town until the mid-1930s. The only state museum in Nikolsk is the Memorial Museum of Alexander Yashin. The museum occupies the house which belonged to Yashin's parents as well as the former house of Yashin.

References

Notes

Sources

Cities and towns in Vologda Oblast
Nikolsky Uyezd